Major Alan Ian Clouter GM (18 September 1941 – 20 February 2015) was a British Army bomb disposal expert who was awarded the George Medal in 1972 for his work in Northern Ireland.

Clouter was awarded the medal after defusing bombs in Northern Ireland including one that had been placed in the Europa Hotel in Belfast.

References

Royal Electrical and Mechanical Engineers officers
Recipients of the George Medal
2015 deaths
1941 births
People from Woolwich
People educated at Haberdashers' Boys' School
Royal Army Ordnance Corps officers
Graduates of the Royal Military Academy Sandhurst
British military personnel of The Troubles (Northern Ireland)